CFZY-FM was a community radio station which operated at 104.1 MHz in Stockholm, Saskatchewan, Canada.

History
Local resident Jody Herperger received approval to operate CFZY-FM from the CRTC on July 10, 1997, primarily to bring the programming of CHOZ-FM St. John's, Newfoundland and Labrador to Stockholm, Saskatchewan as a rebroadcaster.

In 2002, CFZY-FM renewed its licence until August 31, 2009; however, the station ceased broadcasting in 2007 following several years of competition from commercial like-formatted station CFGW-FM in Yorkton.

See also
CHOZ-FM

References

External links

Fzy
Fzy
Fzy
Radio stations established in 1997
Radio stations disestablished in 2007
1997 establishments in Saskatchewan
2007 disestablishments in Saskatchewan